Undeclared War is a 1990 Hong Kong action film directed by Ringo Lam and starring Danny Lee, Olivia Hussey, Peter Liapis, Rosamund Kwan and Vernon G. Wells.

Plot
Warsaw's liberation army is actually a terrorist organization under the banner of a revolution and in order to show their strength, they prepare to create a bombing incident when the US business delegates visit Hong Kong to achieve their political objectives. The CIA finds clues and sends Agent Gary Redner (Peter Liapis) to Hong Kong to prevent this conspiracy. Due to the matter of politics, Hong Kong Police also sends Inspector Lee Ting-bong (Danny Lee) to assist Redner in the operation. The two cops from different environment were incompatible working together at first, but they gradually produced a profound friendship and they work together to shatter the terrorists' attempt to sabotage a media organization's party killing all the Warsaw's liberation Army members. However, thing are not over yet, as Hannibal breaks into the television news department and takes all the staff hostage including Lee's girlfriend Ann (Rosamund Kwan) and prepares to create a bloodshed to be broadcast throughout the world. At this time, Lee and Redner arrives, only to find that Lee's assistant Tang (Tommy Wong) has been bribed by the terrorists and holds them at gunpoint. It ends when Tang sacrifices himself to allow the Police to capture Hannibal and detonate the grenade killing him and bringing Warsaw's liberation army to a fateful end.

Cast
Danny Lee as Inspector Lee Ting-bong
Olivia Hussey as Rebecca Ecke
Peter Liapis as Gary Redner (credited as Peter Lapis)
Rosamund Kwan as Ann Cheung
Vernon G. Wells as Hannibal
Tommy Wong as Lieutenant Tang
Victor Hon as Diem
David Hedison as US Ambassador
Louis Roth as Alex Vladovich
Mars as Tiger
Mark King as Simon
Jonathan Isgar as Iam
Dean Harrington as Callahan
Wong Kwong-fai
Jameson Lam as Special Branch officer
Ng Kwok-kin as Policeman
Suen Kwok-ming as Guard
Chan Tat-kwong
Ernest Mauser
James M. Crockett
Stuart Smith as Colin

Release
Undeclared War was released in Hong Kong on 1 September 1990. The film grossed HK$5,523,958 at the Hong Kong box office.

See also
 List of action films of the 1990s
 List of Hong Kong films of 1990

Notes

External links

Undeclared War at Hong Kong Cinemagic

Undeclared War Film Review at Hong Kong Film Net

1990 films
1990 action thriller films

Hong Kong action thriller films 
1990s Cantonese-language films
Gun fu films
Police detective films
Films directed by Ringo Lam
Films about terrorism
Films set in Hong Kong
Films shot in Hong Kong
Films set in Guangzhou
Films shot in China
Films set in the United States
Films shot in the United States
Films set in Warsaw
Films shot in Warsaw
1990s spy films
1990s Hong Kong films